Kabhi Band Kabhi Baja is a 2018 Pakistani anthology sitcom series that aired on Express Entertainment from 22 June 2018. It is produced and directed by Angeline Malik of Kitni Girhain Baaki Hain fame.

Cast

Minal Khan (Episode 1)
Ahmed Hassan (Episode 1)
Faryal Mehmood
Omer Shahzad
Irfan Khoosat
Noor Khan
Laila Wasti as Iffat
Hammad Farooqui as Zaid Ahmed
Uzma Hassan
Ahmed Hassan 
Raeed Muhammad Alam as Sameer
Samina Ahmad
Ghana Ali
Farhan Ahmed Malhi as Ali
Ali Ansari
Faris Shafi
Sana Arsal
Fazaila Lashari
Uroosa Siddiqui
Nawal Saeed as Mahnoor
Asim Mehmood
Sara Razi
Humayun Ashraf
Alyy Khan
Farah Nadir as Mahnoor's mother
Arjumand Rahim	
Mariyam Nafees
Furqan Qureshi
Parveen Akbar
Benita David
Danish Nawaz
Shabbir Jan
Ali Abbas
Mehmood Aslam
Fariya Sheikh
Yashma Gill
Jahanzeb Khan
Anmol Baloch as Laila
Faraz Farooqui as Arif
Ayaz Samoo
Manzoor Qureshi
Imran Ashraf
Gul-e-Rana
Angeline Malik
Aijaz Aslam
Sami Khan
Saman Ansari
Zaheen Tahira as Safia

Episode list

Production

Filming 
The series is produced by Angeline Malik who is known for her anthology work such as Sasural Ke Rang Anokhay (2012), Kitni Girhain Baaki Hain (2014), Kitni Girhain Baaki Hain (season 2) (2016) and Ustani Jee (2018). Like her previous series, she chose a different cast for each episode for the series.

Accolades

References

2018 Pakistani television series debuts
Pakistani anthology television series
Urdu-language television shows